Manmoyee Girls' School is a 1935 Indian Bengali-language romantic comedy film directed by Jyotish Bannerjee. It is based on Rabindranath Maitra's 1932 play of the same name. The film stars Tulsi Chakraborty, Jahar Ganguly and Kanan Devi. It was a success, and was remade again in Bengali under the same title in 1958.

Plot 

Deciding to start a school for girls named after his wife, the zamindar Damodar (Chakraborty) looks for a married couple to manage the establishment. Manas (Ganguly) and Niharika (Kanan Devi) apply for and get the job. The two are not actually married; they posed as a couple to obtain the job. After a series of complications and delicate situations, love blooms between the two and they marry.

Production 
Manmoyee Girls' School was a play written by Rabindranath Maitra and staged by Star Theatres in 1932. Radha Films Company adapted this play into a film under the same name, with Jyotish Bannerjee directing. D. G. Gune was the cinematographer, while the music was composed by Anath Basu, Mrinal Ghosh and Kumar Mitra. The film was shot at Radha Studio.

Release and reception 
Manmoyee Girls' School was a success, and was remade again in Bengali under the same title in 1958.

References

External links 
 

1930s Bengali-language films
1935 films
1935 romantic comedy films
Bengali-language Indian films
Indian films based on plays
Indian romantic comedy films